Gastón Sauro (born 23 February 1990) is an Argentine footballer who plays as a centre-back for Club Atlético Sarmiento.

Career

Boca Juniors
Sauro made his professional debut with Boca Juniors during the 2008–09 season.

FC Basel
On 6 July 2012 it was announced that Sauro had signed a four-year contract with Swiss club FC Basel. He joined Basel's first team during their 2012–13 season under head coach Heiko Vogel. After appearing in one test game Sauro played his club debut on 17 July in the 2–0 away win against Flora Tallinn in the 1st Leg of the second qualifying round to the 2012–13 UEFA Champions League. He played his Swiss Super League debut on 28 July in the away 2–2 draw against the Grasshopper Club. He scored his first goal for his new team in the home game in the St. Jakob-Park on 26 September. Following a freekick from Marcelo Díaz Sauro headed the ball home for the final goal of the game as Basel won 4–1 against FC Sion.

Basel had started in the 2012–13 UEFA Champions League in the qualifying rounds. But were knocked out of the competition by CFR Cluj in the play-off round. They then continued in the 2012–13 UEFA Europa League group stage. Ending the group in second position, Basel continued in the knockout phase and advanced as far as the semi-finals, there being matched against the reigning UEFA Champions League holders Chelsea. Chelsea won both games advancing 5–2 on aggregate, eventually winning the competition. At the end of the Swiss Super League season 2012–13 he won the Championship title with the team. In the 2012–13 Swiss Cup Basel reached the final, but were runners up behind Grasshopper Club, being defeated 4–3 on penalties, following a 1–1 draw after extra time.

At the start of their 2013–14 season season Sauro was member of the Basel team that won the 2013 Uhrencup. Basel joined the 2013–14 Champions League in the qualifying rounds and they advanced to the group stage. Finishing in third place in their group, Basel qualified for Europa League knockout phase. In the round of 16, second leg, Basel played away from home against Red Bull Salzburg on 20 March 2014. Despite a red card for Marek Suchý (9th minute) and then an early goal against them (22), Basel fought back. Streller scored the equaliser after the break and then Sauro scored his first Europa League goal and it was the winner that took them through to the quarter-finals. However, in the quarter-final they were beaten by Valencia 5-3 on aggregate, after extra time.

At the end of the 2013–14 Super League season Sauro won his second league championship with Basel. The team also reached the final of the Swiss Cup on 21 April 2014. Sauro and Giovanni Sio were both sent off as Basel fell to rivals FC Zürich 2–0 in added extra time, after a goalless 90 minutes.

On 21 August 2014 Basel announced that Sauro was loaned to Catania for the following season.

Catania (loan)
On 19 August 2014, Sauro joined Serie B club Catania on an initial one-year loan deal with an option to buy. He was given the number 15 shirt. He made his Serie B debut on 30 August, coming on as a late substitute for Gino Peruzzi in Catania's 3−3 draw with Virtus Lanciano. In just his second game for the Italian side, Sauro picked up two yellow cards and was sent off in the 70th minute as Catania fell to a 3−2 defeat to Pro Vercelli on 7 September 2014.

Return to Basel
Following his loan period Sauro returned to Basel, but played only in two pre-season matches On 6 August 2015 it was announced that Sauro had signed a three-year contract with Columbus Crew.

During his time with the club Sauro played a total of 91 games for Basel scoring a total of three goals. 35 of these games were in the Swiss Super League, 10 in the Swiss Cup, 20 in the UEFA competitions (Champions League and Europa League) and 26 were friendly games. He scored one goal in the domestic league, one in the Europa League and the other was scored during the test games.

Columbus Crew SC
On 6 August 2015, Sauro signed for Columbus Crew SC of Major League Soccer. He made his MLS debut on 6 September 2015 in a 3–0 loss to FC Dallas, starting but having to come off after seven minutes with a head injury. In the 2015 MLS Cup Playoffs, Sauro played in four of five matches, missing only the home victory over the New York Red Bulls He played the full 90 minutes of Columbus' 2–1 loss in the 2015 MLS Cup to the Portland Timbers.

Sauro tore his PCL in a 0–0 draw with Toronto FC on 21 May 2016, He would be sidelined until a 3 September defeat at the LA Galaxy. On 19 December 2016, Columbus announced that Sauro would miss the entire 2017 season to recover from multiple knee surgeries. Sauro signed a new contract with Columbus on 11 January 2018.

Deportivo Toluca
On 7 August 2019, Sauro transferred to Liga MX side Toluca. He left the club in May 2021.

Club Atlético Sarmiento
On 29 August 2021, Sauro was acquired by Club Atlético Sarmiento of the Argentine Primera División.

Personal
Sauro earned his U.S. green card prior to the 2017 MLS season. This status also qualifies him as a domestic player for MLS roster purposes.

Honours

Club
Boca Juniors
Primera División: 2011 Apertura
Copa Argentina: 2011–12
Copa Libertadores runner-up: 2012

Basel
Swiss Super League: 2012–13, 2013–14
Swiss Cup runner-up: 2012–13, 2013–14
Uhrencup: 2013

Columbus Crew SC
 Eastern Conference (Playoffs): 2015

References

External links

 
 
 
 

Living people
1990 births
Argentine footballers
Footballers from Rosario, Santa Fe
Association football central defenders
Boca Juniors footballers
FC Basel players
Catania S.S.D. players
Columbus Crew players
Deportivo Toluca F.C. players
Club Atlético Sarmiento footballers
Argentine Primera División players
Swiss Super League players
Serie B players
Major League Soccer players
Argentine expatriate footballers
Argentine expatriate sportspeople in Switzerland
Argentine expatriate sportspeople in Italy
Argentine expatriate sportspeople in the United States
Argentine expatriate sportspeople in Mexico
Expatriate footballers in Switzerland
Expatriate footballers in Italy
Expatriate soccer players in the United States
Expatriate footballers in Mexico